Hans Bertil August Antonsson (19 July 1921 – 27 November 2006) was a Swedish heavyweight wrestler. He competed at the 1948, 1952 and 1960 Summer Olympics in freestyle wrestling and won silver medals in 1948 and 1952. In 1956 he entered the Greco-Roman contest instead and finished fifth.

Antonsson took up wrestling at age 14, began competing aged 17, and retired at 47. Besides Olympic medals he won three world, two European and 24 national titles. At the 1953 World Greco-Roman Championships he dominated the reigning Olympic champion Johannes Kotkas, who was 30 kg heavier than Antonsson; he won the world title and was awarded the Svenska Dagbladet Gold Medal later that year.

In retirement, for many years Antonsson headed his native club Trollhättans and refereed wrestling competitions. His brother Bengt and nephew Hans were also prominent wrestlers.

References

External links
 

1921 births
2006 deaths
Olympic wrestlers of Sweden
Wrestlers at the 1948 Summer Olympics
Wrestlers at the 1952 Summer Olympics
Wrestlers at the 1956 Summer Olympics
Wrestlers at the 1960 Summer Olympics
Swedish male sport wrestlers
Olympic silver medalists for Sweden
Olympic medalists in wrestling
People from Trollhättan
World Wrestling Championships medalists
Medalists at the 1952 Summer Olympics
Medalists at the 1948 Summer Olympics
European Wrestling Champions
Sportspeople from Västra Götaland County
20th-century Swedish people
World Wrestling Champions